The 2021 season was the New York Giants' 97th season in the National Football League (NFL) and their second and final under head coach Joe Judge. They failed to improve on their 6–10 output from the previous season and missed the postseason for the fifth consecutive year after a Week 16 loss to the Philadelphia Eagles.

Following the season, general manager Dave Gettleman announced his retirement and head coach Joe Judge was fired.

Offseason

Free agents

Signings

Draft

Undrafted free agents

Staff

Final roster
<noinclude>

Preseason

Regular season

Schedule
The schedule was announced on May 12.

Note: Intra-division opponents are in bold text.

Game summaries

Week 1: vs. Denver Broncos

Former Giants head coach turned Broncos Offensive Coordinator Pat Shurmur returned to MetLife Stadium with Teddy Bridgewater in his first start with the team. 

With 2:41 left in the second quarter and the Giants leading 7-3, their offense gave the Broncos the ball and didn't get back on the field until they were trailing 17-7. On the ensuing drive Daniel Jones had a key fumble giving the ball back to Denver, who then kicked a field goal to make it 20-7. Broncos RB Melvin Gordon later broke through with a 70-yard touchdown run, sealing the win for Denver. Shurmur won his revenge game, and the Giants were 0-1 for the fifth consecutive year and eighth time in nine years.

Week 2: at Washington Football Team

Despite a strong performance by Daniel Jones and scoring their season high in points, the Giants were plagued by miscues; a Jones touchdown run nullified by a holding penalty, a wide open touchdown drop by Darius Slayton, and finally an offside penalty by Dexter Lawrence during a missed field goal on the final play of the game, which gave Washington another chance. The Giants dropped to 0-2 for the fifth consecutive year and eighth time in nine years, and broke a five game winning streak against Washington, losing to them for the first time since 2018. The next day, it was revealed that Lawrence was not offside and in fact jumped when the ball was snapped. The Giants also lost starting center and team captain Nick Gates for the season.

Week 3: vs. Atlanta Falcons

The Giants retired Eli Manning's number 10 at halftime. His first career start in 2004 and only home playoff win in 2011 were both against the Falcons.

With 5:07 to go and a 14-7 lead, new cornerback Adoree Jackson dropped a possible game sealing interception in the end zone, and the Falcons tied the score 2 plays later on a touchdown pass to Olamide Zaccheaus. The Giants got the ball to midfield only to punt it away, and Falcons Pro Bowl kicker Younghoe Koo capped off a 6 play, 59 yard drive with a game-winning 41 yard field goal. For the second time in as many games, the Giants dropped potential game winning passes and lost on the last play of the game. The Giants were dealt another blow after the game when they learned linebacker and captain Blake Martinez suffered a torn ACL and would miss the remainder of the season.

Week 4: at New Orleans Saints

The Giants appeared all but down and out after two Taysom Hill rushing touchdowns for the Saints. After a 26 yard punt return, Daniel Jones and Saquon Barkley gave the Giants new life on a 56 yard touchdown catch and run, and a 2-point conversion to make it a 21-18 game with 6:52 to play. After a defensive stop, Jones led the Giants on a game-tying drive forcing overtime. The Giants won the toss and immediately scored a touchdown on a 6-yard run by Barkley, winning their first game of the season and stunning the Saints fans in the Superdome.

For his performance, Daniel Jones was selected as the NFC Player of the Week.

Week 5: at Dallas Cowboys

An already depleted Giants squad lost Saquon Barkley, Daniel Jones, and Kenny Golladay in the first half. A bright spot for the Giants was the breakout game for Kadarius Toney, who finished with 10 receptions for 189 yards. Despite the performance, Toney was ejected for punching a Cowboys defender in a skirmish late in the 4th quarter.

Week 6: vs. Los Angeles Rams

In a Scorigami game where the Giants honored the 2011 championship team at halftime, they were down 28-3 after surrendering four 2nd quarter touchdowns. Daniel Jones, who cleared concussion protocol to start the game, threw for 3 interceptions.

Rookie Kadarius Toney suffered an ankle injury on the Giants opening drive and did not return to the game.

Week 7: vs. Carolina Panthers

The Giants won their second game of the season with dominant defensive play, holding the Panthers to 173 total yards, and benching quarterback Sam Darnold. After surrendering an opening drive field goal, they only allowed 7 first downs over the next 11 drives, 8 of which ended three-and-out. They also totaled a safety, interception, and 6 sacks.

Daniel Jones finished with 247 all purpose yards, including a 16-yard one-handed catch from wide receiver Dante Pettis in the 3rd quarter.

It was later announced that captain and starting safety Jabrill Peppers tore his ACL in the contest and would miss the remainder of the season. He signed with the New England Patriots in the offseason.

Week 8: at Kansas City Chiefs

Both teams played a sloppy and undisciplined game on a cold night in Kansas City. The Chiefs opened up with a 13 play drive only to be intercepted at the goal line. Daniel Jones threw a pick two plays later and Tyreek Hill opened the scoring for the Chiefs. The Giants managed to make some stops on defense and made the game competitive with a couple of scoring drives, including Kyle Rudolph's first touchdown with the Giants. Evan Engram scored his first touchdown of the season in the fourth quarter to give the Giants the lead, and the Chiefs tied it with a field goal of their own.

Throughout the game, penalties and clock mismanagement became an issue, especially for the Giants in the 4th quarter. In a 17-17 tie game, fullback Elijhaa Penny had a controversial taunting penalty nullify yardage gained from a first down, and a Patrick Mahomes interception on the next drive was nullified by an offsides penalty from Oshane Ximines. The Chiefs took advantage winding down the clock and kicking a game-winning field goal with 1:07 to play. The Giants didn't have any timeouts, and couldn't muster much of an opportunity to extend the game. With the loss, the Giants fell to 2-6 or worse for the 5th consecutive year.

Week 9: vs. Las Vegas Raiders

Evan Engram scored a 30-yard touchdown on the Giants opening drive, and Hunter Renfrow responded in kind for the Raiders. After a Daniel Jones fumble in his own end, the Raiders kicked a field goal to lead 10-7. Both teams traded another set of field goals and the Raiders had a 13-10 halftime lead.

On the opening drive of the second half, Raiders quarterback Derek Carr was intercepted by Xavier McKinney who scored a touchdown to make it 17-13 Giants. After trading another set of field goals, the Raiders subsequent red zone drive in the 4th quarter was cut short by a 25-yard missed field goal by Raiders kicker Daniel Carlson. McKinney recorded a second interception, and the Giants kicked a field goal after forcing the Raiders to burn their timeouts and led 23-16 for the final drive. Carr marched the Raiders down the field and into the red zone, but was strip-sacked by rookie Quincy Roche, his first in the NFL, which was recovered by Leonard Williams to seal the victory for the Giants. The Raiders outgained the Giants 403-245 in yards and 24-16 in first downs, but the Raiders were 1-6 in the red zone. 

The Giants improved to 3–6 with this win heading into their bye week. For his performance, Xavier McKinney was honored as the NFC Defensive Player of the Week.

Week 11: at Tampa Bay Buccaneers

The Giants were overmatched coming out of the bye in front of a national audience and fell to 3-7 and last place in the NFC East. Their only touchdown was set up by an Adoree Jackson interception putting the ball on the 5 yard line, and offensive tackle Andrew Thomas scored his first career touchdown. The Buccaneers offense did not have a single play with negative yardage until Tom Brady was pulled from the game for backup QB Blaine Gabbert well into the 4th quarter.

The next day, the Giants announced they fired offensive coordinator Jason Garrett.

Week 12: vs. Philadelphia Eagles

On the day the Giants retired Michael Strahan's 92, the defense rebounded from their lackluster performance in Tampa and played a masterful game. After a first quarter field goal, Eagles QB Jalen Hurts was intercepted by Darnay Holmes. The defense preserved the 3-0 first half lead on the last play by stopping an Eagles 15-play, 92-yard drive with a Tae Crowder interception on the goal line, a play that would prove disastrous for the Eagles.

In the third quarter after a fourth down stop, the Giants opened up the scoring when Philadelphia native and Temple University walk-on Chris Myarick made an acrobatic touchdown catch, his first in the NFL, to give the Giants a 10-0 lead. Hurts threw an interception to Xavier McKinney, his third of the day. After that, the Eagles decided to aggressively run the football, rushing for 100 yards in the third quarter alone. Boston Scott got the Eagles on the board in the first play of the fourth quarter with a 1-yard touchdown run. After exchanging punts, Kenny Golladay had two critical first-down receptions putting the Giants in field goal range, extending the lead to 13-7 in the closing minutes.

On the next possession with the Eagles driving, Dexter Lawrence forced a Scott fumble, which Julian Love recovered for the Giants with 1:39 to play. The Giants coaches opted to be extra conservative, making the Eagles burn all three timeouts in 23 seconds, giving them the ball back with 1:11 to play.

After three completions from Hurts to rookie RB Kenneth Gainwell for 32 yards, the Eagles drove to the Giants 27-yard line with 37 seconds to play. On first down, Hurts threw a one-on-one ball to the end zone to Jalen Reagor which bounced out of his hands and into the waiting arms of Love, who himself couldn't hold on to the ball, giving the Eagles another chance. On fourth down after two stops, Hurts threw another pass to Reagor on the goal line, which he dropped again, turning the ball over on downs. It was their sixth of the game, and enough for the Giants to escape with the win.

With the win, the Giants improved to 4-7. This was the first time the Giants had a winning streak against the Eagles since they won 3 in a row from 2007-2008. Joe Judge also improved to 4-0 at home against division rivals in his last win as Giants head coach. It was also their third home win in a row, the first time they had done so in five years.

Week 13: at Miami Dolphins

After the Eagles game, it was revealed Daniel Jones sprained his neck in the contest and was officially ruled out on December 3rd. Backup QB Mike Glennon would get his first start with the Giants.

The story in the first half was about field position. After the Giants were pinned deep and moved the ball to midfield, Glennon was intercepted by Xavien Howard who was touched down at the 3-yard line. A Dolphins three-and-out put the Giants in good field position for their next drive, and kicked a field goal to open the scoring. The Dolphins responded with a field goal of their own, and later capped off a 12-play, 89-yard drive to take a 10-3 halftime lead.

The Giants kicked a field goal on their opening drive of the second half to make it 10-6, and there were 2 combined first down over the next 6 drives for both teams. Near the end of the third quarter after taking a sack, Joe Judge called timeout on 2nd and 23. Glennon was sacked on the following play and followed by a delay of game. This sequence deflated the Giants, who gave the ball back to the Dolphins in advantageous field position and scored to make it 17-6. The Dolphins missed a field goal to ice the game and gave the ball back to the Giants, who made it a one-score game again. The defense couldn't get any stops nor could the coaches keep stopping the clock, so the Dolphins kicked one last field goal and defeated the Giants 20-9, winning their fifth game in a row and reviving their playoff hopes.

The Dolphins became the second team to ever win 5 games in a row after a 7 game losing streak (the first being the 1994 Giants). They snapped a 4-game losing streak against the Giants, defeating them for the first time since 2003, also their first time beating them in Miami. Dolphins WR Jaylen Waddle broke Jarvis Landry's franchise record with most catches in a season by a rookie (finished with 84 in 2014) with his 9-catch, 90-yard performance. The Giants fell to 4-8 on the season and backup QB Mike Glennon suffered a concussion in the loss.

Week 14: at Los Angeles Chargers

The injury-ridden 4-9 Giants played against a 7-5 Chargers team in a must-win situation and were blown out. Kyle Rudolph had a career-long 66-yard reception which Elijhaa Penny capped off with his first career touchdown reception, which tied the game at 7-7 late in the first quarter. The Chargers scored 17 points on 4 possessions in the second quarter, including a 59-yard touchdown pass from Justin Herbert to Jalen Guyton. The Giants only gained 29 total yards in the 3rd quarter, and were down 37-7 before scoring two touchdowns late in the game. Saquon Barkley scored his first touchdown since Week 4, and Mike Glennon had his first career rushing touchdown.

Week 15: vs. Dallas Cowboys

The Giants offense was listless for the fifth game in a row. After forcing a Cowboys punt to start the game, Mike Glennon was intercepted on the Giants first drive, which Ezekiel Elliott capped off with a 13-yard touchdown run. Greg Zuerlein made up for the missed extra point by scoring field goals on the next 3 Cowboys possessions to close out the first half and give the Cowboys a 15-3 halftime lead. The last of which was caused by the defense forcing a Saquon Barkley fumble, his first in the NFL.

The Giants converted a 4th and 1 play with a 31-yard run by Devontae Booker, which set up another field goal to make it 15-6. On the next drive with 4th and inches on their own 29, Glennon was stuffed on a QB sneak. Cowboys QB Dak Prescott threw a touchdown pass to Dalton Schultz 5 plays later, but Zuerlein missed his second extra point of the game. Glennon was intercepted on the next drive, and after a series of punts, Lorenzo Carter strip-sacked Prescott to give the Giants the ball on the Cowboys 27 with 8:32 to play. Two plays later, Glennon threw a deep ball to the end zone which was intercepted by Trevon Diggs for his 10th of the season. The Cowboys burned the clock and punted to the Giants, who benched Glennon for Jake Fromm, a rookie QB from Georgia making his NFL debut after being on the Buffalo Bills practice squad just two weeks prior. Despite driving the Giants down the field, Fromm turned the ball over on downs, sealing the Cowboys 21-6 victory.

The Giants fell to 4-10 and had their 5th season in a row of 10+ losses, and were swept by the Cowboys for the 4th time in 5 years, and the 6th time in 9 years. The Cowboys improved to 10-4 but failed to clinch a playoff spot when the 49ers and Saints both won later that day.

The next day, the Giants announced they were shutting down starting quarterback Daniel Jones for the last three games of the season.

Week 16: at Philadelphia Eagles

Jake Fromm made his first career NFL start as the Giants visited the Eagles seeking to even their all-time series and complete their first season sweep of Philadelphia since the 2007 season.

While New York got off to a sluggish start on offense in the first half, only scoring a Graham Gano field goal, the defense would pick up the slack, limiting Philadelphia to a field goal of their own. However, miscues on both sides of the ball for the Giants in the second half would lead to the Eagles blowing the game wide open. Fromm completed 6 of 17 passes for 25 yards and an interception before being benched in the third quarter for Mike Glennon. Glennon would finish 17 of 27 for 93 yards, a garbage-time touchdown to Evan Engram, and a pick-six by Alex Singleton. Lane Johnson had his first career touchdown for the Eagles late in the game.

With the loss, New York failed to improve on their 6-10 record from the year before, and was eliminated from playoff contention for the 5th straight year. This was New York's eighth straight road loss to Philadelphia dating back to the 2014 season, as well as their 90th overall loss to their rivals.

Week 17: at Chicago Bears

Saquon Barkley had his first 100 rushing yard game since his ACL injury (also in Chicago), but the Giants fell to 4-12 and finished the game with -10 net passing yards, the worst by an NFL team since 1998. They also became the first team since 2009 to end a game with negative passing yards.

Robert Quinn set the Bears franchise record with his 18th sack of the season, passing Hall of Famer Richard Dent, and David Montgomery tacked on two rushing touchdowns for the Bears.

Week 18: vs. Washington Football Team

In a near empty MetLife Stadium, the Giants offense only had 78 total yards through the first three quarters, including QB sneaks on back-to-back plays - 2nd and 11 on the NYG-2, 3rd and 9 on the NYG-4 - in the second quarter, to the chagrin of the fans in attendance. Washington had a 12-0 lead going into the fourth quarter after two first half field goals and a Bobby McCain pick six. Jake Fromm threw his first touchdown pass to Darius Slayton for the Giants, then Antonio Gibson scored a touchdown for Washington. After a Fromm fumble, Joey Slye kicked his third field goal of the game to close out the 2021 season for both teams.

With the loss, the Giants finished the season 4-13 on a 6-game losing streak, all by double digits, the first such occurrence in franchise history. This was the second time in franchise history the Giants lost 13 games, and the first time the Giants had been swept by Washington since 2011. Joe Judge became the first Giants head coach to lose 13 games in a season. (Ben McAdoo only lost 10 games in 2017, as he was fired before the end of the season.)

The Giants recorded just 5 receiving touchdowns by wide receivers all season. Free agent signee Kenny Golladay and first round pick Kadarius Toney both failed to record a touchdown. Slayton's touchdown was the first by a Giants wide receiver since Dante Pettis in Week 7.

The Giants secured the 5th and 7th picks in the 2022 NFL Draft, the latter by virtue of the Chicago Bears in the Justin Fields trade.

The following day, the Giants announced Dave Gettleman's retirement as General Manager after a 19-46 record over four seasons, and that Judge would remain as head coach in 2022. However, the team went back on that promise and fired Judge the following day, finishing with a 10-23 record.

Notably, this was the last game the Washington Football Team played with their temporary moniker, rebranding as the Commanders ahead the 2022 season after changing their name in 2020 during the social unrest following the murder of George Floyd.

Standings

Division

Conference

References

External links
 

New York Giants
New York Giants seasons
New York Giants season
21st century in East Rutherford, New Jersey
Meadowlands Sports Complex